The 2018–19 season is a season played by Anderlecht, a Belgian football club based in Anderlecht, Brussels. The season covers the period from 1 July 2018 to 30 June 2019. Anderlecht will be participating in the Belgian First Division A, Belgian Cup and the UEFA Europa League.

Match details

Belgian First Division A

Regular season

Matches

Championship play-off

Belgian Cup

UEFA Europa League

Group stage

Appearances and goals
Source:
Numbers in parentheses denote appearances as substitute.
Players with names struck through and marked  left the club during the playing season.
Players with names in italics and marked * were on loan from another club for the whole of their season with Anderlecht.
Players listed with no appearances have been in the matchday squad but only as unused substitutes.
Key to positions: GK – Goalkeeper; DF – Defender; MF – Midfielder; FW – Forward

See also
2018–19 in Belgian football
2018–19 Belgian First Division A
2018–19 Belgian Cup
2018–19 UEFA Europa League

References

Anderlecht
R.S.C. Anderlecht seasons
Anderlecht